Bucculatrix porthmis is a moth in the  family Bucculatricidae. It was described by Edward Meyrick in 1908. It is found in South Africa.

References

Natural History Museum Lepidoptera generic names catalog

Bucculatricidae
Moths described in 1908
Taxa named by Edward Meyrick
Moths of Africa